This was the seventh time India participated in the Commonwealth Games India ranked 6th in the medal tally.

Medalists

Gold Medalists

Silver Medalists

Bronze Medalists

References

India at the Commonwealth Games
1974 in Indian sport
Nations at the 1974 British Commonwealth Games